A360 may refer to:

 A360 Lena Highway, a road in the Sakha Republic in Russia
 A360 road, a road in Wiltshire, England
 A360media, an American publisher of books and magazines